Statistics of Swedish football Division 2 for the 1959 season.

League standings

Norrland

Svealand

Västra Götaland

Östra Götaland

Allsvenskan promotion playoffs 
IFK Luleå - Jönköpings Södra IF 1-9 (1-2, 0-7)
Degerfors IF - Landskrona BoIS 7-6 (2-3, 3-2, 2-1)

Jönköpings Södra IF and Degerfors IF promoted to Allsvenskan.

References
Sweden - List of final tables (Clas Glenning)

Swedish Football Division 2 seasons
2
Sweden
Sweden